is a train station in Nichinan, Miyazaki Prefecture, Japan.

Lines

Layout 
The station consists of an island platform serving two tracks at grade. The station building is built in traditional Japanese style to resemble a castle with white plaster namako walls. It houses a staffed ticket window and a waiting area. Access to the island platform is by means of a level crossing. A bike shed and parking is available at the station forecourt.

Management of the passenger facilities at the station has been outsourced to the JR Kyushu Tetsudou Eigyou Co., a wholly owned subsidiary of JR Kyushu specialising in station services. It staffs the ticket booth which is equipped with a POS machine but does not have a Midori no Madoguchi facility.

Adjacent stations

History
The line was then extended northwards in phases, reaching  by 1937. The track was extended further north with Kitagō opening as the northern terminus on 28 October 1941. Obi was one of several intermediate stations opened on the same day on the new track. The route was designated the Nichinan Line on 8 May 1963. With the privatization of JNR on 1 April 1987, the station came under the control of JR Kyushu.

Passenger statistics
In fiscal 2016, the station was used by an average of 355 passengers daily (boarding passengers only), and it ranked 285th among the busiest stations of JR Kyushu.

See also
List of railway stations in Japan

References

External links
Obi (JR Kyushu)

Railway stations in Miyazaki Prefecture
Railway stations in Japan opened in 1941